Vlastimil Kopecký (14 October 1912 – 30 July 1967) was a Czech football player. He played 26 games for Czechoslovakia, scoring eight goals. He was a participant in the 1934 and 1938 FIFA World Cups.

Club career
There were rumours, that Kopecky was to transfer to Slavia Prague or Sparta Prague from Rapid Vinohrady in early November 1931. However in mid-November, Rapid announced that he was not to do so. Playing for Slavia Prague, he scored 252 league goals in 325 matches (1931/32-1950). He twice scored five goals in a single match for Slavia. He is the second highest Czech league goalscorer in history, only Josef Bican has scored more goals in the Czech league. He died of a heart attack on the football pitch.

Career statistics

Style of play
Josef Bican commented on his and Vlastimil's relationship on the field; "We understood each other perfectly: we were, as it were, connected mentally. Whenever Vlasta had the ball at his feet, I felt what he was going to do with it, and he felt the same when I had the ball. It was simple and logical. I knew that he would handle the ball in the way that was most beneficial for the team at that moment, and I arranged accordingly. He was the best technician I ever met. We passed without even looking.

Honours 
Czechoslovak First League: 1932–33, 1933–34, 1934–35, 1936–37, 1939–40, 1940–41, 1941–42, 1942–43, 1946–47, 1948
Czechoslovak Cup: 1940–41, 1941–42, 1944-45
Central Bohemian Cup: 1932, 1935, 1941, 1943, 1944
Liberty Cup: 1945
Mitropa Cup: 1938

References

External links

  Profile at Slavia Praha website
  ČMFS entry

1912 births
1967 deaths
Czech footballers
Czechoslovak footballers
1934 FIFA World Cup players
1938 FIFA World Cup players
SK Slavia Prague players
Czechoslovakia international footballers
Czech football managers
Czechoslovak football managers
SK Slavia Prague managers
People from Havlíčkův Brod District
Association football forwards
Sportspeople from the Vysočina Region